Al-Rabi ibn Abu al-Huqayq was a Jewish poet of the Banu al-Nadir in Medina, who flourished shortly before the Hijra (622 CE).

His family was in possession of the fort Qamus, situated near Khaybar. Like most of the Medina Jews, he took part in the quarrels between the two Arab tribes of that town, and was present at the battle of Bu'ath, 617, which took place in the territory of the Banu Qurayza.

Al-Rabi was a poet of note. He had a contest at capping verses with the famous Arabic poet, al-Nabighah, the latter reciting one hemistich, while Al-Rabi had to supply the next, keeping to the same meter and finding a rhyme. He has been credited with the authorship of other poems, but upon dubious authority. One of these poems used to be recited by Abun, the son of the Caliph Uthman. From its contents, however (it criticizes the folly of his own people), it seems more likely to have been written by one of Abun's sons, who bore the same name as Al-Rabi. It might, then, have been composed after the submission of the Banu Qurayza.

Al-Rabi's three sons (Al-Rabi ibn al-Rabi, Kinana ibn al-Rabi and Sallam ibn al-Rabi) were among Muhammad's most bitter opponents. An account of Al-Rabi can be found in vol. xxi. of the Kitab al-Aghani, ed. Brünnow, p. 91. He is cited among the Arabic Jewish poets by Moses ibn Ezra in his Kitab al-Muhadharah (Rev. Ét. Juives, xxi.102).

See also
Non-Muslim interactants with Muslims during Muhammad's era

References
 Hartwig Hirschfeld and Richard Gottheil, Al-Rabi ibn Abu al-Huqayq, Jewish Encyclopedia. Funk and Wagnalls, 1901–1906; citing:
Nöldeke, Beiträge zur Kenntniss der Poesie der alten Araber, pp. 72 et seq.;
Hirschfeld, in Rev. Ét. Juives, vii. 152, 299.H. Hir. G.

Arabic-language poets
Banu Nadir
Jewish poets
7th-century Arabian Jews
7th-century Arabic poets
Pre-Islamic Arabian poets